The Conquering Horde is a 1931 American pre-Code Western directed by Edward Sloman and written by Emerson Hough, Grover Jones and William Slavens McNutt. The film stars Richard Arlen, Fay Wray, Claude Gillingwater, Ian Maclaren, Frank Rice, Arthur Stone and George Mendoza. The film was released on January 31, 1931, by Paramount Pictures. It was a remake of North of 36 (1924).

Cast 
Richard Arlen as Dan McMasters
Fay Wray as Taisie Lockhart
Claude Gillingwater as Jim Nabours
Ian Maclaren as Marvin Fletcher
Frank Rice as Spud Grogan
Arthur Stone as Lumpy Lorrigan
George Mendoza as Cinco Centavos
James Durkin as Amos Corley
Charles Stevens as John
Ed Brady as Splint Goggin
Bob Kortman as Digger Hale
Harry Cording as Butch Daggett
Chief Standing Bear as White Cloud
John Elliott as Captain Wilkins
Kathrin Clare Ward as Mrs. Amos Corley

Plot
Dan McMasters arrives in Texas from Washington to help establish a route for ranchers to get their cattle to market. He faces opposition from land barons who are accustomed to charging tolls for use of their land.

Production

The railroad scenes were filmed on the Sierra Railroad in Tuolumne County, California.

See also 
North of 36 (1924)
The Texans (1938)

References

External links 
 

1931 films
1931 Western (genre) films
American Western (genre) films
Films directed by Edward Sloman
American black-and-white films
Films based on American novels
Films based on Western (genre) novels
Remakes of American films
Sound film remakes of silent films
Paramount Pictures films
1930s English-language films
1930s American films